Theo Martins is an American Artist, Songwriter, and Actor.  His output has drawn praise from outlets including The LA Times, GQ magazine, The Washington Post and Wallpaper Magazine.

Life and career 
Martins was born in Providence, Rhode Island. Martins credits his parents for the musical and artistic exposure gained throughout his upbringing. He noted that his mother found casting calls searching local newspapers while his father was a trumpeter and avid music collector.

References

External links 

Official Soundcloud profile
Theo Martins Discography on Discogs

Living people
African-American male rappers
University of Rhode Island alumni
Actors from Providence, Rhode Island
East Coast hip hop musicians
Male actors from Rhode Island
Musicians from Providence, Rhode Island
African-American record producers
American bloggers
American hip hop record producers
Songwriters from Rhode Island
Rappers from Rhode Island
1987 births
21st-century American rappers
American male bloggers
21st-century American male musicians
African-American songwriters
21st-century African-American writers
20th-century African-American people
American male songwriters